Phantom Club is an isometric 3D arcade adventure game released by Ocean in 1987 for the Sinclair Spectrum and Amstrad CPC.

Plot 
Plutus the Zelator, the lowest-ranked member of the Phantom Club of superheroes, must defeat Zarg and the other evil superheroes.

Gameplay 
The player controls Plutus the Zelator in his mission against Zarg and his minions. Plutus is armed with a freeze-ray to defend himself and complete his mission. A variety of hostile superheroes will try to kill him, each with different powers. Some of these enemies are indestructible and must be avoided. In addition, Plutus must avoid carnivorous plants, spiders, hostile robots, and other dangerous objects and creatures.

Useful objects encountered include:
Spheres, which award extra lives
Diamonds, extra speed
Tubes, allow the game to be saved
Movie Screens, when shot give details of additional missions

Plutus increases in rank as he progresses in the mission; when he reaches the rank of Ipsisimus he is ready to challenge Zarg.

Development 
Phantom Club was written by Hungarian programmer Dusko "The Duke" Dimitrijevic, having previously programmed the game Movie.

Reviews 

Sinclair User: "... Phantom Club is pretty hard on the eyes because some of the colour choices are terrible - would you believe white on green, or purple on white?"

References

External links 

1987 video games
Action-adventure games
Video games with isometric graphics
ZX Spectrum games
Amstrad CPC games
Video games developed in Serbia
Single-player video games
Superhero video games
Ocean Software games